Xenostegia, the morningvines, are a genus of flowering plants in the bindweed and morning glory family Convolvulaceae, found across the Old World Tropics and Subtropics, from Africa, Madagascar, the Indian Subcontinent, southern Asia and Australia.

Species
Currently accepted species include:

Xenostegia alatipes (Dammer) A.R.Simões & Staples
Xenostegia lomamiensis Sosef & Gereau
Xenostegia medium (L.) D.F.Austin & Staples
Xenostegia pinnata (Hochst. ex Choisy) A.R.Simões & Staples
Xenostegia sapinii (De Wild.) A.R.Simões & Staples
Xenostegia tridentata (L.) D.F.Austin & Staples

References 

Convolvulaceae genera
Convolvulaceae